The Strong Mayors, Building Homes Act is a statute in Ontario that grants extra powers to the Mayor of Toronto and the Mayor of Ottawa within their mayor–council governments.

Powers granted
The Act grants the Mayors of Toronto and Ottawa direct control over:
 Drafting of the city budgets
 The appointments and dismissals of their city managers and department leaders (except police chiefs, fire chiefs, or auditors general)
 Vetoes over laws that may conflict with provincial priorities, which may be overturned if a supermajority of two-thirds of city councillors voted to do so
 The creation and reorganisation of municipal administrative departments

Reactions
John Tory, the mayor of Toronto at the time, expressed appreciation for the powers granted to him under the act.

Outgoing Ottawa mayor Jim Watson deemed the powers unnecessary, also opining that "if they have to gather up two-thirds of their members to overturn a mayor's decision that's not really democratic at all." Mayoral candidate Catherine McKenney criticised the reforms as "undemocratic."

Former Hamilton mayor Bob Bratina expressed support for the powers. Andrea Horwath, a mayoral candidate, opposed the powers.

Bonnie Crombie, mayor of Mississauga has voiced opposition to the Act.

Further developments
Premier Doug Ford has promised similar powers to the mayors of other cities in Ontario for 2023.

References

External links
 Bill 3

2022 in Canadian law
Ontario provincial legislation
Local government in Ontario
Local government legislation